= Mohra Saiyidan =

- Town
- Location within Pakistan
- Coordinates: 33.23°N 73.19°E
- Country: Pakistan
- Province: (Islamabad Capital Territory) Islamabad C.T
- Elevation: 480 m (1,570 ft)

Population
  - Total: 83,461
- Time zone: UTC+5 (PST)

Mohra Saiyidan is a town in the Islamabad Capital Territory of Pakistan. It is located at 33° 23' 10N 73° 19' 10E with an altitude of 480 metres (1578 feet).
